Dr. Abdul Jabbar Junejo (26 November 1935 – 12 July 2011) was a Sindhi writer, poet, novelist, story-writer, critic, linguist, historian and musicologist of Sindh, Pakistan.

Early life
He was born on 26 November 1935 at Pir Fateh Shah Village, District Badin, Sindh, Pakistan. He did his MA in Sindhi in 1962 with distinguished marks and was awarded the gold medal. He earned his Ph.D. on the topic: “The Influence of Persian Poetry on Sindhi Poetry”. He had a good deal of language competence in English, Chinese and Persian.

Career
He started his career as a junior lecturer in 1960; later on he joined the Department of Sindhi, University of Sindh, Jamshoro as a lecturer in Sindhi in 1962. He served as the chairperson of the Department of Sindhi and also meritoriously climbed to the level of the Dean, Faculty of Art, University of Sindh, Jamshoro. He also served as a director of Laar Museum 2004 to 2007.

Contribution
He wrote the Brief History of Sindhi Literature in three volumes. He produced monumental critical work on the poetry of Shah Abdul Latif. He was a great connoisseur on Sindhi classic music. There are 65 books in the Sindhi language, 10 books in the Urdu language, and about 200 research articles on the various topics to his credit. On December 18, 2011, Ms. Sussui Palejo, minister of Culture Department inaugurated Dr. Abdul Jabbar Junejo Corner, in Zafar Kazim Art Gallery, in Sindh Museum, Hyderabad. After his death a hall in Sindhi department of Sindh University Jamshoro had been named Abdul Jabbar Junejo hall for tributing him regarding his rendered services.

Death
Junejo died due to kidney failure on 12 July 2011.

References

1935 births
2011 deaths
20th-century Pakistani historians
Linguists from Pakistan
Pakistani musicologists
People from Badin District
Sindhi-language poets
Sindhi-language writers
Sindhi people
Academic staff of the University of Sindh
Writers from Sindh
20th-century poets